Joseph Anthony Mower (August 22, 1827 – January 6, 1870) was a Union general during the American Civil War. He was a competent officer, and he was well respected by his troops and fellow officers. He was known among his troops as "Fighting Joe". Major General William Tecumseh Sherman said of Mower, "he's the boldest young officer we have".

Biography
Mower was born in Woodstock, Vermont. He volunteered as a private in the Mexican–American War. In 1855 he entered the U.S. army as a 2nd Lieutenant in the 1st U.S. Infantry. As part of the 1st US Infantry, Mower saw action in the Battle of Wilson's Creek in August 1861.  Still with the regiment during the Battle of Island No. 10, Major-General John Pope selected Mower to construct a siege battery in front of New Madrid, leading to the capture of that river port early in the campaign.  He later became colonel of the 11th Missouri Infantry Regiment and fought at the Siege of Corinth. He assumed command of the 2nd Brigade of the 2nd Division in the Army of the Mississippi and led it into action at the Battle of Corinth. He was wounded in the neck and taken prisoner by Confederate forces but he was recovered by Union soldiers the same day. 

He was promoted to brigadier general of volunteers on November 29, 1862. He recovered from his wounds and returned to command a brigade during the Vicksburg Campaign and siege of Vicksburg where he caught the attention of William T. Sherman. During the Red River Campaign he commanded the 1st and 3rd Divisions of the XVI Army Corps and won brevets in the regular army for actions at the battles of Fort De Russy and Yellow Bayou. He commanded the 1st Division of the Right Wing, XVI Corps at the Battle of Tupelo. 

He was promoted to major general on August 12, 1864, and General Sherman ordered Mower to join the Union forces in Atlanta. He commanded the 1st Division of the XVII Army Corps during the March to the Sea and the Carolinas Campaign. His division played a significant role in the battles of Salkehatchie and Bentonville. Sherman made him commander of XX Corps in the Army of Georgia late in the war. After the fighting had ceased, he sailed for Texas along with General Gordon Granger. He was placed in command of the District of Eastern Texas.
After the war he stayed in the army and became Colonel of the 39th U.S. Infantry and the 25th U.S. Infantry. He died in New Orleans, Louisiana, on January 6, 1870.

See also

 List of American Civil War generals (Union)

References

 Eicher, John H., & Eicher, David J., Civil War High Commands, Stanford University Press, 2001, .
 
 Foote, Shelby., The Civil War: A Narrative, Red River to Appomattox, Random House,

External links
 
 Arlington National Cemetery

1827 births
1870 deaths
American Civil War prisoners of war
Burials at Arlington National Cemetery
Deaths from pneumonia in Louisiana
People from Woodstock, Vermont
People of Vermont in the American Civil War
Union Army generals